Armağan Dam is a dam in Kırklareli Province, Turkey, built between 1986 and 1998.

See also
List of dams and reservoirs in Turkey

External links
DSI

Dams in Kırklareli Province
Dams completed in 1998